The Isole Tremiti, also called "Isole Diomedee" (Diomedes' Islands, from Greek Diomèdee, Διομήδεες) are an archipelago in the Adriatic Sea, north of the Gargano Peninsula. They constitute a "comune" of Italy's Province of Foggia and form part of the Gargano national park. The archipelago is composed of 5 islands: San Domino, San Nicola, Capraia, Cretaccio, and Pianosa.

The islands were used for the internment of political prisoners during Benito Mussolini's Fascist regime. But it was also the prison of Julia the Younger, the granddaughter of Augustus and, in 780, the prison of Paul the Deacon at the behest of Charlemagne.

The islands are now an important tourist attraction because of the clear waters surrounding them. Up to 100,000 visitors come to the islands in the summer season. Ferry services from the mainland operate from Termoli, Vieste, Rodi Garganico and Capoiale, while Alidaunia offers flights from San Domino Heliport to Foggia and Vieste.

Toponym 
The origin of the name of the islands is uncertain. Some of the theories include:
 it may relate to the seismic hazard of the area, which has a long history of earthquakes (from Latin "tremor", meaning "tremor")
 it may date back to the times of Augustus, who exiled his granddaughter Julia the Younger to one of these islands, and then named Trimerus in Latin, maybe from Greek Trimeros, Τρίμερος, meaning "three places" or "three islands"). 
 it may be due to the three-peak hill on the main island described by the cleric Basilio Sereno in an epigram written to Celso Bishop of Vercelli

Islands 
San Domino is where most of the population resides. It is the most developed island for tourism and has the only sand beach in the archipelago.
San Nicola  It is the site of a monastery where a monk named Nicolò was buried. Legend has it that every time someone tried to move his corpse off the island, a violent storm would break out, preventing navigation around the island.
Capraia (or Capperaia) is deserted.
Cretaccio is a large block of clay and thus uninhabited.
Pianosa is a small, uninhabited island. Sometimes, during storms, the waves cover it.

History 
Inhabited since late Iron Age times (4th-3rd centuries BC), the Tremiti Islands have been a place of confinement since ancient times. Roman emperor Augustus had his granddaughter Julia the Younger transferred here, where she died after 20 years. In the Middle Ages, the archipelago was ruled by the Abbey of Santa Maria a Mare ("Holy Mary on the Sea") at San Nicola island, apparently founded here in the 9th century by Benedictine monks from Montecassino.

In the 13th century, the abbey had gained its autonomy from the father monastery, and owned lands from the Biferno to Trani on the Apulian mainland. After an alleged period of moral decadence, in 1237 the Benedictines were replaced by the Cistercian order. In 1334 the abbey was sacked by Dalmatian pirates from Omiš.

In 1412 the Lateran Canons took ownership of the islands and restored the abbey with cisterns and fortifications which withstood the assault of Ottoman ships in 1567. The abbey was suppressed in 1783 by King Ferdinand IV of Naples, who set up a penal colony.

During the Napoleonic age the islands were a stronghold of Joachim Murat's supporters, who resisted a British fleet in 1809. In 1843, to repopulate the islands, King Ferdinand II of Two Sicilies moved several people from Naples' slums to the islands, who mostly became fishermen.

In 1911, about 1,300 Libyans who had resisted Italian colonial rule were confined to Tremiti. After a year, around one-third of them had died, mainly from typhus.

1930s 
During the Fascist era, the archipelago continued to perform its function of confinement, detaining, among others, Amerigo Dumini, and future president of the Republic, Sandro Pertini.

Mussolini had hundreds of homosexuals deported to San Domino, in 1938. No law prohibited homosexuality at the time, and Mussolini also denied its existence, saying, "In Italy, there are only real men".  However, suspected or reported homosexuals were rounded up and deported. San Domino had the distinction of being the only internment camp in which all the prisoners were gay. The conditions on the island were very difficult, and a few died.

The dormitories were spartan, with no electricity or running water. A bell would ring at 8 p.m. each day, signaling that the men were no longer allowed to be outside. For the remainder of the night, they were locked in their dorm rooms, under police supervision.

The internment camp closed in 1939, as Italy became enmeshed in the beginnings of World War II.

2010s 
In May 2012, the provincial government caused a scandal by attempting to sell off blocks of land on two of the islands for development for a reported €4m. Local environmental groups campaigned vigorously and in the event, there were no bidders.

See also
 List of islands of Italy
 Punta del Diavolo Lighthouse

Sources

References

External links

Tremiti Islands. How to get there, plan a day trip, excursion with kids
Collecting landraces and wild relatives in the Tremiti Islands (FAO)
Isole Tremiti

Islands of the Adriatic Sea
Defunct prisons in Italy
Islands of Apulia
Archipelagoes of Italy